The Empire Tower is a skyscraper located in Sathon business district, Bangkok, Thailand, adjacent to Sathon Road and Narathiwat Road, close to Chong Nonsi Station (Silom Line of the BTS Skytrain).  Empire Tower 1 is currently the 15th tallest building in Bangkok. It is the tallest all office building in Thailand.  The Empire Tower 1 has 62 floors and is 227 metres tall.

Structural Feature 
The Empire Tower has 58 floors and a height of 227 meters. Its total floor space is 350,000 square meters. Three office buildings are joined to make up The Empire Tower. It’s also the best place for large-scale events and businesses of all sorts since it has the largest rental space in Thailand.

Interior

Rental Space

Office Space for Rent 
The Empire Tower in Sathorn might be regarded as a Grade A office building because of its lengthy construction. It was uncommon to create structures with high ceilings back then. The Empire Tower has a floor area of 3,500 square meters and a net area of 155,000 square meters.

Rentable Retail Space 
One of the rental office towers with somewhat sizable shop areas is Empire Tower. Three stories make up the Empire Tower's retail area, and the B1 Floor (Basement Floor) is where Top Supermarket, a bank, numerous stores, and a sizable food court are located.

Facilities

Parking 
Up to 2,500 automobiles may park at the Empire Tower. Typically, one parking place is provided for every 100 square meters rented. However, if other businesses decide to lease office space in the Empire Tower and the parking lot fills up, they will request parking.

The following categories make up the parking class:

1. The underground parking garage comprises six levels. From floors B1 through B6, parking is accessible.

2. Parking is available on floors 1 through 10 of non-basement parking garages.

To meet the enormous number of visitors visiting the skyscraper, the Empire Tower has set up 7 passenger elevators in the parking lot.

Lift 
Inside the Empire Tower, there is an elevator.

As follows, Empire Tower has 2 types of elevators to facilitate the tenants in the building:

Passenger Lift 
There are 52 high-speed lifts in the Empire Tower. In order to avoid having too many passengers, each building is split into low, mid, and high zones. Additionally, it removes the need to endure a protracted elevator wait, especially during peak hours.

Service Lift 
Four elevators are available in the Empire Tower to accommodate the demands of clients who rent office space there. It can move goods without being constrained by time. Typically, it is not permissible to load or unload cargo in the morning, midday, or after work.

Restaurants 
The Empire tower is filled with various restaurants with different price ranges to choose from.

Under 150 Baht 

 Getfresh by Dressed (～60 - 250฿)

A restaurant that has a concept to present food that is good for your health using organic ingredients or cultivating only from environmentally friendly production sources.

 Starbucks (～70 - 250฿)

A coffee shop from America in Seattle, Washington. Which is very popular around the world.  

 Au Bon Pain  (～75฿ - 250฿)

A French-style bakery that makes bread with no trans fat.

 O-li-no Crepe&Tea (～100 - 250฿)

A Japanese-style cold crepe with a taste that appeals to teenagers.

 PAUL (～100 - 250฿)

A french style bakery with many selections of French pancakes, simple dishes, and different french desserts.

 SO asean Cafe & Restaurant (～100 - 250฿)

You may sample all of the national dishes at this restaurant, which offers Asean food.

 Muteki by Mugendai (～100 - 400฿)

A Japanese restaurant that is gaining popularity among foodies, caused of the outstanding “Casual Japanese Food” with a lot of menus to choose from, that will takes your dining experience to a new level.

 Farmfactory (～129 - 249฿)

A well-known brand as a healthy salad for health lovers. The price is not high for people who diet.

Under 300 Baht 

 อ้วนนะ หมูกรอบชาชู (Aunnashashu) (～200 - 720฿)

An Original Chashu Crispy Pork Belly that takes up to 3 days to cook, which has a very good flavor.

 Acai Story (～250 - 400฿)

A healthy cafe that is filled with fresh fruit and low calory dessert.

 Wuanood (วัวนู้ด) (～250฿)

An authentic premium homestyle Thai beef noodle, that came straight from a small district in Chiangmai.

Above 300 Baht 

 Fufu Taiwanese Shabu (～500 - 1000฿)

A Premiere Buffet Shabu from “Taiwan”, that is fit for all styles of people, meat lovers, seafood, or even premiere grade meat.

 KubKao' KubPla (～500 - 1,000฿)

Thai flavor restaurant with high-quality products prepared in a homey manner.  

 Kouen Yakiniku & Sushi Bar (～500 - 1500฿)

A Premiere Japanese buffet restaurant with a different price range, the more expensive the more menu are available.

See also
List of tallest buildings in Thailand

References

Office buildings completed in 1999
Skyscrapers in Bangkok
Sathon district
Skyscraper office buildings in Thailand
1999 establishments in Thailand